12 Bloody Spies is a compilation album by American rock band Chevelle. The album was released on October 26, 2018 by Epic Records. The album consists of B-sides, rarities, covers, and remixes recorded between 2003 and 2016.

Background 
The single, "Sleep Walking Elite", a B-side from the Vena Sera sessions, was released on September 27, 2018. On September 28, the compilation album was announced. The album's second single, "In Debt to the Earth," was released on October 12.

The song, "Until You're Reformed", a B-side from the Wonder What's Next sessions, was originally released in 2003 on Daredevil: The Album. "Fizgig," a B-side from the Sci-Fi Crimes sessions, was originally released on the band's greatest hits album Stray Arrows: A Collection of Favorites in 2012.

Track listing

Personnel
Pete Loeffler – lead vocals, guitar
Sam Loeffler – drums
Dean Bernardini – bass, backing vocals
Joe Loeffler – bass, backing vocals (tracks 5 and 9)

Charts

References 

2018 compilation albums
Chevelle (band) compilation albums
B-side compilation albums
Epic Records compilation albums